The Apaporis River is a river of the Vaupés Department, Colombia. It is a tributary of the Caquetá or Japurá River.
In the last stretch before the river joins the Caquetá it forms part of the boundary between Colombia and Brazil.

See also
List of rivers of Colombia
List of rivers of Brazil

References

Rivers of Colombia
Rivers of Brazil
International rivers of South America
Brazil–Colombia border
Border rivers